Pepperpot or pepper pot may refer to:

 A pepper shaker
 Several types of soup including
 Guyana Pepperpot, an Amerindian dish popular in Guyana and the Caribbean
 Philadelphia Pepper Pot, a thick stew of beef tripe, vegetables, pepper and other seasonings
 Mrs. Pepperpot, a fictional character in a series of children's books
 Pepper Pot, Brighton, a building in Brighton, England
 Pepper Pot Centre, a charity supporting people from African, Caribbean and BME communities in West London
 Pepperpot, Godalming, a building in Godalming, Surrey, England
 Pepperpot (lighthouse), a type of small lighthouse
 Pepperpot (revolver), a multi-shot handheld firearm
 A microscopic structure on butterfly wings that causes Iridescence
 "Pepperpots", a series of British middle-age female characters on Monty Python's Flying Circus
 The name of a dance figure in the Quickstep
 Pepper-potting, a military tactic used in individual movement techniques
 A fungus of the genus Myriostoma

See also

 Pepper Potts, fictional character